The Ministry of Home Affairs is a ministry of the People's Republic of Bangladesh. An interior ministry, it is mainly responsible for the maintenance of internal security and domestic policy. It contains two divisions 1. Public Security Division, 2. Security Service Division It has been modelled to function as an ideal and efficient ministry of the government.

Senior officials

Ministerial team
The ministerial team at the MHA (mha.gov.bd) is headed by the Minister of Home Affairs, who is assigned to them to manage the ministers office and ministry.
Minister  — Mr. Asaduzzaman Khan, MP (Bangladesh Awami League)

Home Secretary and other senior officials
The Ministers are supported by a number of civilian, scientific and professional advisors. The Home Secretary is the senior civil servant at the MHA. His/Her role is to ensure the MHA operates effectively as a department of the government.

Senior Secretary, Public Security Division  — Md. Akhter Hossian 
Secretary, Security Services Division -  Md. Abdullah Al Masud Chowdhury

Departments

Public Security Division

Bangladesh Police
Border Guard Bangladesh
Matters relating to coordination by administrative, diplomatic, security, intelligence, legal, regulatory and economic agencies of the country for the management of international borders, creation of infrastructure like roads/fencing and floodlighting of borders, border areas development programme pilot project on Multi-purpose National Identity Card.
Bangladesh Coast Guard
Dealing with management of coastal borders.
Bangladesh Ansar and VDP
Dealing with management assistance of law and order along with other enforcement agencies. Village Defence Party works for the village law and order along with socioeconomic development.

Security Services Division
Department of Narcotics Control
Controls the Illegal trafficking, use and consumption of narcotic Drugs.
Department of Immigration & Passport
Department of Fire Service & Civil Defence
Department of Prison
National Identity Wing
The National Identity Wing (NIDW) is a wing of the Department of Immigration & Passports headed by a Director-General with 71 officers and staff of various categories. The wing is organized with three branches, seven sections, and 9 units for issuance and management of National ID smartcards and administering all related activities, including the maintenance of the National Citizenship Database and delivery of identity verification services to qualified public and private organizations.

References 

 
Home Affairs
Bangladesh